Alcalá de Ebro is a municipality located in the province of Zaragoza, Aragon, Spain. According to the 2004 census (INE), the municipality has a population of 279 inhabitants.

According to Jan Morris ("Spain", p. 33), Alcalá del Ebro is the fictional Isla Barataria which Sancho Panza ruled in Don Quixote.

References

Municipalities in the Province of Zaragoza